Mehraban may refer to:
 Katnaghbyur, Aragatsotn, a town in Armenia
 Mehraban, Iran, a city in West Azerbaijan Province, Iran
 Mehraban, Gilan, a village in Gilan Province, Iran
 Mehraban, Kohgiluyeh and Boyer-Ahmad, a village in Kohgiluyeh and Boyer-Ahmad Province, Iran
 Mehraban, Lorestan, a village in Lorestan Province, Iran
 Mehraban District, an administrative subdivision of Iran
 Mehraban (sheep), a breed of sheep